Spirit Lake is a city in Dickinson County, Iowa, United States. The population was 5,439 at the 2020 census. It is the county seat of Dickinson County.

The town is located along the western shore of East Okoboji Lake, in the Iowa Great Lakes region.

History
The Dakota Sioux originated the name of "Spirit Lake" referring to it as "The Lake of The Spirit." In 1856, three brothers-in-law created the town of Spirit Lake after a visit to the Lakes area piqued their interest. The three brothers-in-law, O.C. Howe, B.F. Parmenter, and R.U. Wheelock, were soon joined by various other settlers, making homes along the lakes' shores. These settlers however, did not  get along peacefully with the natives, and on March 13, 1857 Chief Inkpaduta of the Sioux led a revolt against the non-native settlers, killing all but four women.

Geography

Demographics

2010 census
As of the census of 2010, there were 4,840 people, 2,157 households, and 1,268 families living in the city. The racial makeup of the city was 97.7% White, 0.2% African American, 0.2% Native American, 0.6% Asian, 0.1% Pacific Islander, 0.1% from other races, and 1.1% from two or more races. Hispanic or Latino of any race were 1.3% of the population.

There were 2,157 households, of which 27.2% had children under the age of 18 living with them, 47.5% were married couples living together, 7.6% had a female householder with no husband present, 3.7% had a male householder with no wife present, and 41.2% were non-families. 36.5% of all households were made up of individuals, and 16.8% had someone living alone who was 65 years of age or older. The average household size was 2.19 and the average family size was 2.88.

The median age in the city was 41.9 years. 23.1% of residents were under the age of 18; 6% were between the ages of 18 and 24; 24.6% were from 25 to 44; 26.3% were from 45 to 64; and 19.9% were 65 years of age or older. The gender makeup of the city was 47.1% male and 52.9% female.

2000 census
As of the census of 2000, there were 4,261 people, 1,792 households, and 1,130 families living in the city. The racial makeup of the city was 98.99% White, 0.14% African American, 0.12% Native American, 0.05% Asian, 0.09% from other races, and 0.61% from two or more races. Hispanic or Latino of any race were 0.63% of the population.

There were 1,792 households, out of which 29.3% had children under the age of 18 living with them, 50.6% were married couples living together, 10.3% had a female householder with no husband present, and 36.9% were non-families. 32.8% of all households were made up of individuals, and 15.5% had someone living alone who was 65 years of age or older. The average household size was 2.30 and the average family size was 2.92.

Age spread: 24.6% under the age of 18, 6.9% from 18 to 24, 25.8% from 25 to 44, 23.9% from 45 to 64, and 18.8% who were 65 years of age or older. The median age was 40 years. For every 100 females, there were 85.1 males. For every 100 females age 18 and over, there were 81.6 males.

The median income for a household in the city was $36,224, and the median income for a family was $44,652. Males had a median income of $30,746 versus $21,357 for females. The per capita income for the city was $18,661. About 5.3% of families and 6.6% of the population were below the poverty line, including 2.9% of those under age 18 and 12.6% of those age 65 or over.

Education
Public education in the city of Spirit Lake is provided by the Spirit Lake Community School District.

Media
Spirit Lake is served by the Dickinson County News, both in print and online, KUOO-FM (103.9) and KUQQ-FM.

Notable people
Berkley Bedell (1921–2019), member of the U.S. House of Representatives from Iowa's 6th district (1975–1987)
Margaret Hance (1923–1990), first female mayor of Phoenix, Arizona (1976–1983)
Douglas Franklin Wright (1940–1996), serial killer

See also

Berkley, a manufacturer of fishing tackle, fishing reels and rods, located in Spirit Lake.
Spirit Lake Massacre, an 1857 attack by a Wahpetuke band of Santee Sioux.
Indian Motorcycles and Victory Motorcycles, are motorcycle manufacturers owned by Polaris Industries based in Spirit Lake.

References

External links

Cities in Iowa
Cities in Dickinson County, Iowa
Micropolitan areas of Iowa
County seats in Iowa